Dora is a city in Walker County, Alabama, United States.

History
The first settlers in the area now known as Dora were James. M. Davis, Ezekiel Morgan, and Cole Smith in the early 1830s. Later in the 1830s, homesteaders settled here. The Kansas City, Memphis and Birmingham Railroad laid a line through the settlement in 1886, and called their depot "Sharon". The Magella Coal Company and the Horse Creek Coal and Coke Company were founded, and by 1890, the area was called Horse Creek and incorporated as the town of Horse Creek in 1897. By 1900, several coal mines were located nearby. There was a school, churches, businesses and doctors. The name was changed to Dora in 1906. At the 2020 census the population was 2,297, up from 2,024 in 2010.

Geography

Demographics

2000 census
At the 2000 census there were 2,413 people, 984 households, and 711 families living in the city. The racial makeup of the city was 80.61% White, 16.66% Black or African American, 0.29% Native American, 0.21% Asian, 0.08% Pacific Islander, 0.08% from other races, and 2.07% from two or more races. 0.12% of the population were Hispanic or Latino of any race.
Of the 984 households 32.9% had children under the age of 18 living with them, 50.3% were married couples living together, 18.8% had a female householder with no husband present, and 27.7% were non-families. 25.3% of households were one person and 11.8% were one person aged 65 or older. The average household size was 2.45 and the average family size was 2.93.

The age distribution was 26.2% under the age of 18, 8.8% from 18 to 24, 26.5% from 25 to 44, 25.1% from 45 to 64, and 13.5% 65 or older. The median age was 36 years. For every 100 females, there were 81.8 males. For every 100 females age 18 and over, there were 80.3 males.

The median household income was $21,458 and the median family income  was $29,000. Males had a median income of $28,942 versus $19,886 for females. The per capita income for the city was $14,560. About 23.1% of families and 27.9% of the population were below the poverty line, including 39.0% of those under age 18 and 23.5% of those age 65 or over.

2010 census
At the 2010 census there were 2,025 people, 820 households, and 575 families living in the city. The racial makeup of the city was 85.6% White, 12.2% Black or African American, 0.3% Native American, 0% Asian, 0.1% Pacific Islander, 0.3% from other races, and 1.3% from two or more races. 0.7% of the population were Hispanic or Latino of any race.
Of the 820 households 27.0% had children under the age of 18 living with them, 48.8% were married couples living together, 17.1% had a female householder with no husband present, and 29.9% were non-families. 27.2% of households were one person and 11.3% were one person aged 65 or older. The average household size was 2.47 and the average family size was 2.98.

The age distribution was 23.6% under the age of 18, 8.4% from 18 to 24, 26.3% from 25 to 44, 25.5% from 45 to 64, and 16.2% 65 or older. The median age was 39.2 years. For every 100 females, there were 91.4 males. For every 100 females age 18 and over, there were 97.6 males.

The median household income was $26,596 and the median family income  was $37,946. Males had a median income of $35,586 versus $22,652 for females. The per capita income for the city was $18,902. About 29.0% of families and 25.0% of the population were below the poverty line, including 42.3% of those under age 18 and 3.1% of those age 65 or over.

The city is home to Dora High School with students from Elementary and Middle Schools in Sumiton. The mascot for the high school is the bulldog and it is a member of the Walker County Board of Education.

2020 census

As of the 2020 United States census, there were 2,297 people, 901 households, and 596 families residing in the city.

Notable people
 Ivy Andrews, former Major League Baseball pitcher
 Terry Fell, country music singer
 Sybil Gibson, painter
 Howard Goodman (gospel singer), gospel music
 Chavis Williams, former linebacker for the Baltimore Ravens
 Jimi Westbrook, Musician in the band Little Big Town

See also
Birmingham District

References

External links

Birmingham metropolitan area, Alabama
Cities in Alabama
Cities in Walker County, Alabama
Historic American Engineering Record in Alabama